Jackie Kahane (1921-2001) was a stand-up comedian, actor and writer.

Kahane was born on 29 September 1921 in Narajow, Galicia, which is in present day Ukraine. He was most notable for working with Elvis Presley from 1972 until his death in 1977, during which time he was once booed off the stage in Madison Square Garden due to the crowds impatience to see Presley perform. He is also known for featuring in Elvis on Tour (1972), and appearing numerous times on The David Frost Show, The Tonight Show with Johnny Carson, and The Ed Sullivan Show. In 1961, Kahane was selected along with Bill Cosby as one of Time magazine's outstanding comedians.

He wrote and delivered the eulogy at Elvis' funeral, and died after a lengthy battle with cancer on 26 March 2001 in Encino, California.

References

1921 births
2001 deaths
American stand-up comedians
American male comedians
American male actors
People from Tarnów
Comedians from Montreal
Male actors from Montreal
Writers from Montreal
Deaths from cancer in California
20th-century American comedians
20th-century American male writers
Canadian emigrants to the United States